A team sport includes any sport where individuals are organized into opposing teams which compete to win or cooperate to entertain their audience. Team members act together towards a shared objective. This can be done in a number of ways such as outscoring the opposing team. Team members set goals, make decisions, communicate, manage conflict, and solve problems in a supportive, trusting atmosphere in order to accomplish their objectives. Examples are basketball, volleyball, rugby, water polo, handball, lacrosse, cricket, baseball, and the various forms of football, and hockey. Team sports require internal coordination between members of the team in order to achieve success.

Team sports are practiced between opposing teams, where the players generally interact directly and simultaneously between them to achieve an objective. The objective often involves teammates facilitating the movement of a ball or similar object in accordance with a set of rules, in order to score points. 

The meaning of a "team sport" has been disputed in recent years. Some types of sports have different objectives or rules than "traditional" team sports. These types of team sports do not involve teammates facilitating the movement of a ball or similar object in accordance with a set of rules, in order to score points. For example, swimming, rowing, sailing, dragon boat racing, and track and field among others can also be considered team sports.

In other types of team sports, there may not be an opposing team or point scoring, for example, mountaineering. Instead of points scored against an opposing team, the relative difficulty of the climb or walk is the measure of the achievement. In some sports where participants are entered by a team, they do not only compete against members of other teams but also against each other for points towards championship standings. 

For example, motorsport, particularly Formula One. In cycling however, team members whilst still in competition with each other, will also work towards assisting one, usually a specialist, member of the team to the highest possible finishing position. This process is known as team orders and although previously accepted was banned in Formula One between 2002 and 2010. After a controversy involving team orders at the 2010 German Grand Prix however, the regulation was removed as of the  season.

History

Traces of sprinting as a team sport extend back several thousand years – as evidenced in images in the cave in Lascaux in France which depict people running after animals or vice versa; this was an issue of survival of the fittest.

Organized athletics]76 BC, with ongoing activity recorded up to 393 BC. These ancient Olympic Games tested warrior skills and consisted of running, long jump, boxing, wrestling, Pankration (combat sport),  discus throw, and javelin throw. In the Bayankhongor Province of Mongolia, Neolithic-era cave paintings dating to 7000 BC depict a wrestling match surrounded by crowds. Prehistoric cave-paintings in Japan show a sport similar to sumo wrestling. In Wadi Sura, near Gilf Kebir in Libya, a Neolithic rock painting in the cave of swimmers shows evidence of swimming and archery being practiced around 6000 BC.

The term "athlete", according to mythology, derives from the name of Aethlius,
the mythological first King of Elis (the location of Olympia) in Greece. The practice of young athletes carrying flaming torches is also traced to the King of Elis, under whose supervision the games took place; some historians regard this as the first record of Olympic sprint racing. The winner of the race was crowned with a wreath of olive or laurel. In subsequent years monetary attractions were introduced as prize money.

The present-day pattern of Olympic Games resembles the practice followed in ancient times. Sprint was the coveted event. The 200 m sprint is known in Greek as "short foot race". The 400 m race is equivalent to two stades and called diaulos in Greek.

Olympic team sports

All Olympic team sports include competitions for both men and women.

Summer Olympics

Winter Olympics

Ice hockey and curling are team sports at the Winter Olympics together with the bobsleigh competition where the men's event has classes for both two-man and four-man sleds, but the women's class is restricted to two persons only.

See also
 Individual sport
 Major professional sports teams of the United States and Canada
 Professional sports leagues in the United States
 Relay race
 Most valuable player

References

Citations

Sources

External links 

 

Sports terminology
 
Sports